Unbreakable – The Greatest Hits Volume 1 is the first greatest hits album by Irish boy band Westlife. The album was released on 11 November 2002. It was also the band's fourth album to be released as a five-piece and with RCA Records and Sony BMG. The album consists of all of the group's past singles, along with six new songs. Hit single "Flying Without Wings" was re-recorded as a duet with South Korean singer BoA and Mexican singer Cristian Castro, and each respective duet was included on the Asian and Spanish editions of the album respectively. The first single released from the album was "Unbreakable", a UK number-one single. The second single, the double A-side "Tonight" / "Miss You Nights" peaked at number three in the UK and at number one in the Republic of Ireland.

Unbreakable peaked at number one in the UK and sold close to 1.8 million copies in the UK alone. The album was the ninth best-selling album of 2002 in the UK. It is also the band's biggest selling album so far and their longest charting album. It managed to re-enter the year-end albums chart of 2007 at number 107. In October 2008, IFPI announced that the album was certified 2× Platinum, exceeding two million sales in Europe. On the year-end album charts of 2008, the album re-entered at number 79 with 191,000 copies sold within the year. The album spent 55 weeks on the UK Top 100 Albums chart. This is the fifth best-selling album of 2002 in Ireland.

In 2008, the album was re-issued in an exclusive two disc edition, entitled "Unbreakable: The Greatest Hits - 2008 NZ Tour Edition". The package featured the album, with the same track listing, plus the "Live at Wembley" 2006 concert DVD. It peaked at No. 1 on the albums chart there, and achieved 2× Platinum status, with more than 30,000 copies sold. The album finished at No. 19 on the 2008 New Zealand Year-end charts.

Track listing

 Additional Bonus Disc (available at Woolworths via a Daily Mirror promotion)
 "World of Our Own" (US Mix) - 3:30 from World of Our Own (2001)
 "More Than Words" - 3:58 from Westlife (1999)
 "Forever" - 5:05 from Westlife (1999), Swear It Again EP
 "You Don't Know" - 4:12 from World of Our Own
 "Interview With Westlife" - 5:00

Charts

Weekly charts

Year-end charts

Decade-end charts

Certifications

The Greatest Hits Tour

Video release

A DVD containing the music videos of the group's greatest hits was one of the five best-selling music DVDs of 2002 and BMG's fourth biggest-selling concert music DVDs the same year.

Track listing
 "Swear It Again"
 "If I Let You Go"
 "Flying Without Wings"
 "I have a dream"
 "Seasons in the sun"
 "Fool Again"
 "My Love"
 "What Makes A Man"
 "Uptown Girl"
 "When you're looking like that"
 "I lay my love on you" 
 "Queen of My Heart"
 "Angel"
 "World of Our Own

 "Bop Bop Baby"
 "Unbreakable"
 "Behind The Scenes Documentary"
 "Before They Were Famous..."
 "Swear It Again" (US version)
 "World of our own" (US Version)

Chart performance

Certifications and sales

References

2002 greatest hits albums
Westlife albums
Albums produced by Steve Mac
Albums produced by David Kreuger
Albums produced by Per Magnusson
Albums produced by Rami Yacoub
Sony BMG compilation albums